Techi Neri (born 10 May 1994) is an Indian cricketer who represents Arunachal Pradesh in domestic cricket. He made his List A debut for Arunachal Pradesh in the 2018–19 Vijay Hazare Trophy on 19 September 2018. He made his first-class debut for Arunachal Pradesh in the 2018–19 Ranji Trophy on 28 November 2018. In August 2022, he was named in the North East Zone's team for the 2022-23 Duleep Trophy.

References

External links
 

1994 births
Living people
Indian cricketers
Arunachal Pradesh cricketers
Place of birth missing (living people)